John Stalker (11 February 1881 – 28 November 1931) was a New Zealand rugby union player. He played six matches on that tour but did not appear in any internationals. Stalker later became a referee, officiating at matches to provincial level.

Stalker also enjoyed some success as an athlete, finishing second in the 440 yards at the 1901 national championships, and representing New Zealand at the Australasian championships the same year.

References

1881 births
1931 deaths
Rugby union players from Dunedin
New Zealand rugby union players
New Zealand international rugby union players
Otago rugby union players
Manawatu rugby union players
Rugby union centres
New Zealand male sprinters
New Zealand rugby union referees